The Markdale Majors were a Canadian Intermediate (Senior) team from the town of Markdale, Ontario.  An entry which competed in the Central Ontario Hockey League, later swallowed by the WOAA Senior Hockey League.

History
The Markdale Majors were the final champions in COHL history.  In 1982, as a member of the WOAA, the COHL final was played between Markdale and Hillsburgh, Markdale came out on top.  They were league finalists in 1980 and 1981, losing out to Dundalk and Honeywood respectively.

The farm team of the Majors was the Markdale Mohawks of the Northern Junior D Hockey League.

Defunct ice hockey teams in Canada
Ice hockey teams in Ontario